KCC Mall de Zamboanga is the third KCC Mall in the Philippines. It is owned by Koronadal Commercial Corporation (KCC) with their headquarters in General Santos. KCC Mall de Zamboanga is the biggest KCC Mall, and also the largest mall in Zamboanga City and in Zamboanga Peninsula. The mall is located along Gov. Camins Avenue, one of the busiest thoroughfares in the city.

History and location
Koronadal Commercial Corporation (KCC) started in 1951 as a textile store in Koronadal City. It then expanded in 1989 into a supermarket and department store as KCC Shopping Center. KCC expanded in 1992 General Santos as KCC Warehouse Plaza, which was later renamed as KCC Mall of GenSan in 1996. With their growing profitability over the cities of Koronadal and General Santos, KCC then ventured for their expansion in other cities within Mindanao, to include the cities of Zamboanga and Cotabato.

In 2012, KCC bought a 3.5-hectare lot at Governor Camins Avenue, Zamboanga City. Along with the local government, the groundbreaking was then commenced on October 10, 2012. The massive construction, starting with the deep excavation of lands to be used as two levels down from the ground floor, was started in November 2012. With its location near the Zamboanga International Airport, KCC specialized its mall structure in order to not interfere the airport's main runway.

The mall made its grand opening on December 10, 2015.

The Mall
It anchors KCC Supermarket with 83 check-out counters and Mindanao's largest so far, the KCC Department Store, KCC Cinema with 6 digital cinemas (including a newly renovated Cinema 6 with recliner seats), and of around 200+ tenants.

Of the tenants, most of them had set foot to Zamboanga City as Zamboanga's first, to include Burger King which is also the first in Mindanao.

East Wing
The East Wing is the mall's current expansion which is located at the eastern side of the mall. The new wing opened on September 27, 2017, with 5 storeys and basement. Once opened, Since KCC Mall de Zamboanga's East Wing is opened it is the fourth largest mall in Mindanao next to SM CDO Downtown Premier. The expansion features two levels of shopping connected to the main mall, a Convention Center, and additional parking spaces.

Gallery

See also
 KCC Malls

References

Shopping malls in Zamboanga City